Memorial University Press (formerly ISER Books) is a university press associated with Memorial University of Newfoundland. The press publishes books that focus on the North Atlantic (with a special emphasis on Newfoundland, Labrador, and Atlantic Canada). Memorial University Press is a member of the Association of Canadian University Presses and the Association of Canadian Publishers.

See also

 List of university presses

References

External links 
Memorial University Press

Memorial University Press
University presses of Canada